Elena Vladimirovna Chernenko  is a Russian journalist and antiwar activist. She is a special correspondent and head of the foreign desk at the Moscow daily newspaper Kommersant.

Chernenko holds a PhD from Moscow State University. She has worked for Russian Newsweek, the Voice of Russia and the Moskauer Deutsche Zeitung.

On 24 February 2022, as Russia invaded Ukraine, Chernenko launched an anti-war petition, gathering over 100 journalists' signatures.

References

Year of birth missing (living people)
Living people
Russian anti-war activists
Russian activists against the 2022 Russian invasion of Ukraine
Russian women journalists
Moscow State University alumni
Journalists from Moscow
21st-century Russian journalists
Russian reporters and correspondents